Longispora is a Gram-positive, aerobic and non-motile genus of bacteria from the family Micromonosporaceae.

References

Further reading 

Micromonosporaceae
Bacteria genera